Pāpak Fort or Babak Castle, ″Ghal’eh-e  Baz″ is a large citadel on the top of a mountain in the  Arasbaran forests, 50 km from Ahar, one parasang from Ardabil, 6 km southwest of Kalibar City in northwestern Iran. According to Ibn al- Nadim, it was the stronghold of Javidhan and Babak Khorramdin, the leaders of the Khurramites in Iranian Azerbaijan who fought the Islamic caliphate of Abbassids. The fort was conquered and ruined by Afshin′s army in 837.

Access 
The castle is built at an altitude of 2300–2600 meters and is surrounded by 400 to 600 meter gorges. Access to the castle can be found using a long series of broken steps that lead to the top of a hill. After that, the easiest route is a long dirt track. At the end of the dirt track, the route turns left. The first sign of the ruins appears on the left, leaving two peaks to cross. The first peak has views of the castle. After ascending a second peak with additional ruins, the trail passes sheer cliffs on the right with no railings.

The surrounding Arasbaran oak forest, jagged cliffs and mountains in the distance can be seen from the castle. The last stretch to the main castle is a narrow passageway and a 200-meter corridor-shaped temple. The castle is nearly impossible to capture, due to it being high in the mountains and protected by ice and snow.

History 
The castle is believed to belong to the Parthian dynasty, with modifications under the Sasanid dynasty.

Khurramites in the fort 
The movement of Khurramites in Azerbaijan was associated with Javidhan who was a landlord leader of one of the two Khurramite movements in Azerbaijan (from 807-808 to 816-817), with his headquarters being in Badd, located close to the Aras river. The leader of the other Khurramite movement was Abu Imran, who often clashed with Javidhans forces. During one of the clashes, in probably 816, Abu Imran was defeated and killed, whilst Javidhan was mortally wounded, dying three days later. Javidhan was succeeded by his apprentice Babak Khorramdin, who also married Javidhan's widow.

Tabari records that Babak started his revolt in 816–817. At first, Al-Ma'mun paid little attention to Babak′s uprising because of the difficulty of intervening from distant Khorasan, the appointment of his successor, and the actions of al-Fadl ibn Sahl. Such conditions paved the way for Babak and his supporters. Caliph Al-Ma'mun sent general Yahya ibn Mu'adh who fought against Babak in 819–820, but could not defeat him. Two years later Babak overcame the forces of Isa ibn Muhammad ibn Abi Khalid. In 824–825, the Caliphate generals Ahmad ibn al Junayd and Zorayq b. ′Alī b. Ṣadaqa were sent to subdue Babak's revolt. Babak defeated them and captured Jonayd. In 827–828 Moḥammad b. Ḥomayd was sent to overcome Babak.

Despite several victories, his troops were defeated by Babak during the last battle at Hashtadsar in 829. Caliph Al-Ma′mun's moves against Babak had failed when he died in 833. Babak's victories over Arab generals were associated with his possession of Badd fort and the inaccessible mountain stronghold, according to Arab historians who mentioned that his influence also extended to the territories of today’s Azerbaijan Republic- "southward to near Ardabīl and Marand, eastward to the Caspian Sea and the Shamakhi district and Shervan, northward to the Mughan (Moḡān) steppe and the Aras river bank, westward to the districts of Julfa, Nakhchivan, and Marand".

The last battle between the Arab caliphate and the Khurramites took place in the fortress of Badd on 837. The Khurramites were defeated and Afshin reached Badd. Afshin had additional forces from the Caliphate under the Arab magnate Abū Dolaf and settled in a camp six miles away from Badd fortress. He used this camp as a base for mountain attacks against Badd. After setting up siege machinery and naphtha-throwers, he was able to invade Badd. The Khurramites were defeated and after capturing the Badd fortress, Babak escaped, but was later captured and executed.

Present day 
The remaining parts of the fortress are currently known as Qaḷʿa-ye Jomhūr. It is situated 50km from Ahar on the left branch of Qarasū river. A castle and a palace on the top of a mountain remain from the Badd fort.

The castle was included in the list of national, historical and cultural places in 1966. It was then renovated by the Cultural Heritage Organization of Iran and is used as a hiking destination.

Coin and pottery samples have been found belonging to the 13th century. Among these findings were also carved and glazed potteries, dating to the beginning of the 7th century.

Gallery

See also
Iranian architecture
Arasbaran forests
Atashgah Castle

Notes

External links

 More Pictures in Tishineh

Buildings and structures completed in the 3rd century BC
Castles in Iran
Buildings and structures in East Azerbaijan Province
Tourist attractions in East Azerbaijan Province
National works of Iran
Parthian architecture
Sasanian castles